In audio engineering, a bus (alternate spelling buss, plural busses) is a signal path which can be used to combine (sum) individual audio signal paths together. It is used typically to group several individual  audio tracks which can be then manipulated, as a group, like another track. This can be achieved by routing the signal physically by ways of switches and cable patches on a  mixing console, or by manipulating software features on a  digital audio workstation (DAW).

Using busses allow the engineer to work in a more efficient way and with better consistency, for instance to apply sound processing effects and adjust levels for several tracks at a time.

See also
 Live sound mixing
 Sound recording and reproduction
 Bus (computing)
 Software bus
  Stem mixing

References

Audio engineering